The men's 10,000 metres in speed skating at the 1998 Winter Olympics took place on 17 February, at the M-Wave arena.

Records
Prior to this competition, the existing world and Olympic records were as follows:

The following new world record was set during this competition.

Results

References

Men's speed skating at the 1998 Winter Olympics